"Foolin'" is the second single from British singer Dionne Bromfield's second studio album, Good for the Soul. The song features American rapper Lil Twist and was released 5 June 2011 and a new release 7 July 2011. It reached 7 on the Bulgarian Top 40, however it failed to enter the UK Singles Chart.

Music video
The music video was filmed in the United Kingdom by UK director Trudy Bellinger.

Synopsis
The scenes in the video sees Bromfield with three different alter ego's sitting on chairs in a Bar before the scene switches to her sitting by a swimming pool, where she is later accompanied by a male.

The video also features Chris and Wes, winners of the 2011 season of Sky1's show Got to Dance, as her backup dancers.

In just over three weeks, the video went past one million views on YouTube, making it Bromfield's most-viewed video to date. It was uploaded to YouTube on 18 May 2011 at a total length of three minutes and twenty-two seconds.

Track listings and formats

Chart performance

Release history

References

External links 
 

2011 singles
Dionne Bromfield songs
Songs written by Eg White
2011 songs